The World Knowledge Forum (WKF, 세계지식포럼) is a non-profit entity, which aims to promote balanced global growth and prosperity through knowledge-sharing. The World Knowledge Forum aims to "brings together global leaders to address the importance of knowledge in meeting the challenges and opportunities of a rapidly changing world".

The World Knowledge Forum was conceived as part of the Vision Korea Project, a campaign launched by Maeil Business Newspaper in 1997, to "propose new visions for development to Korea and to the global community". The first World Knowledge Forum, entitled ‘Shaping the New Millennium with Knowledge,’ took place in 2000, shortly after the Asian financial crisis.

Partnering with Nikkei and Bloomberg the Forum has now grown to encompass 1,053 sessions featuring over 4,028 speakers in total from all around the world.

In the 19th WKF, the speakers, Janet Yellen, Chair of the Board of Governors of the Federal Reserve System (2014-2018); Kersti Kaljulaid, President of Estonia; Arancha Gonzalez, executive director of International Trade Center (ITC); H. R. McMaster, The 26th White House National Security Council (NSC) Advisor of the Trump administration;  Rajeev Suri, CEO of Nokia; Kenneth C. Frazier, CEO of Merck & Co., Inc.; John Kim, President of New York Life Insurance Company; Jane Jie Sun, CEO of Ctrip; Wang Zhenghua, President of Spring Airlines; and Eric Allison, Head of Uber Elevate were present to grace the occasion under the theme, "Collective Intelligence: Overcoming Global Pandemonium".

History 

The World Knowledge Forum (WKF) was founded in October 2000 by Chang Dae-Whan, a Chairman of Maekyung Media Group. Immediately after the 1997 Asian Financial Crisis, the Vision Korea Project was launched to formulate ways to move Korea forward. Then in the following year, in 1998, the World Knowledge Forum Secretariat was established with Chairman Chang Dae-Whan presiding over the Forum's executive committee. After two years of preparation, the first World Knowledge Forum was held with the ambition to transform Korea into a knowledge driven nation. Under the theme, “Shaping the New Millennium with Knowledge”, the first forum composed of 32 sessions led by over 90 speakers.

In the following year, in 2001, the WKF formed media partnerships with prominent media outlets such as Financial Times, Bloomberg, and CNBC that helped the WKF gain its reputation globally. In the same year, the World Knowledge Corps was created.

Since 2010, top MBA courses were incorporated as sessions at WKF. New York University Stern School of Business first joined the WKF to hold an MBA session on finance. Then in 2013, HEC Paris and CEIBS newly joined to host their special MBA sessions. Currently, six world's leading business schools are holding MBA sessions at the WKF. The schools include INSEAD, IE Business School, NYU Stern, HEC Paris, Tsinghua SEM, and Guanghua School of Management.

Every year, the World Knowledge Forum gathers more than 4,000 business and opinion leaders around the world ranging from environmental and international organizations to world's major corporations and institutions. Forum's leaders discuss about the current issues and present their insights to find possible solutions for a more promising future. The main aim is to highlight the importance of knowledge sharing towards a balanced prosperity of the global economy. With the new venue at the Seoul Shilla Hotel in 2014, the official season two of the Knowledge Forum began. Then in 2015, another venue, Jangchung Arena was newly added.

Themes 

Forum themes have ranged from "Shaping the New Millennium With Knowledge" in 2000 to "Knowledge in a World of Risk" in 2002; from "Creativity & Collaboration: Foundation of the New Era" in 2005 to "Collabonomics & Greater Asia" in 2008. The 2010 WKF overall theme was "One Asia Momentum: G20 Leadership And Creatinnovation", and the WKF 2013 was "One Asia Metamorphosis".

Organization 

The World Knowledge Forum is organized by Maekyung Media Group including Maeil Business Newspaper and Maeil Broadcasting Network (MBN).

References

External links 

 

Knowledge sharing